Ronald Crawford Conway (born March 9, 1951) is an American venture capitalist and philanthropist. He has been described as one of Silicon Valley's "super angels".

Early career
Conway graduated from San Jose State University with a bachelor's degree in political science.

Conway worked with National Semiconductor Corporation in marketing positions from 1973 to 1979, and at Altos Computer Systems as president and CEO from 1988 to 1990. He was the CEO of Personal Training Systems (PTS) from 1991 to 1995. PTS was acquired by SmartForce/SkillSoft.

Investing

Conway began angel investing in the mid-1990s, with investments in Marimba Systems, Red Herring magazine, and others. He raised $4 million for his first venture capital fund, called Adam Ventures, in 1997. In December 1998 he started Angel Investors LP, a venture capital firm. Within two months he had raised $30 million for its first fund, Angel Investors I. Angel Investors closed on its second fund, Angel Investors II, at the end of 1999, raising $150 million. Angel Investors LP was an early investor in Google, Ask Jeeves, Loudcloud, Napster, and PayPal. Conway was recognized for his success with Angel Investors LP by inclusion in the 2006 Forbes Midas list of top dealmakers.

Conway was a special partner at Baseline Ventures from 2006 through 2009. In 2009 Conway turned his personal investment vehicle, SV Angel, into a venture capital firm, raising $10 million from outside investors. SV Angel raised six funds through 2018. In 2018, Conway announced that SV Angel would retool its investing strategy for a time, returning to a "back to basics" role as individual angels instead of raising a new fund. In March 2022, Conway announced that SV Angel had raised $269 million for its first-ever growth equity fund. The new fund will be led by Ashvin Bachireddy, who previously co-founded Geodesic Capital. "A goal of this fund is to take the DNA of the seed fund and bring it to the growth stage," said SV Angel Managing Co-director Topher Conway. "We don't lead rounds, we collaborate and don't want to crowd anyone out." SV Angel also promoted Beth Turner to lead its seed fund, with Ron & Topher Conway overseeing both funds as Managing Co-directors.

List of investments

Among Conway's 650 or more investments are:

 Airbnb
 Attributor
 Blippy
 Digg
 Facebook
 Google
 LotusFlare
 OMGPOP
 Reddit
 OZY

Philanthropy

Civic and public health 
Conway is active in community and philanthropic activities, serving as Vice Chairman of UCSF Medical Foundation in San Francisco and also as co-chair of the "Fight for Mike" Homer and Creutzfeldt–Jakob disease. He is on the development committees of UCLA, St. Francis High School, Sacred Heart Schools, The UCSF Medical Center in San Francisco, Packard Children's Hospital, Legacy Ventures, and Ronald McDonald House at Stanford. He serves on the Benefit Committee of the Tiger Woods Foundation.

Political views

In 2021 Conway joined The Giving Pledge, a campaign established by Bill Gates and Warren Buffett to persuade and recruit extremely wealthy people to contribute a majority of their wealth to philanthropic causes.

In 2022 Conway donated $2.5 million to Mila Kunis and Ashton Kutchers' 'Stand with Ukraine' GoFundMe as well as $25,000 to Ariana Grande's Protect & Defend Trans Youth Fund.

Gun violence

Conway is on the advisory board of Sandy Hook Promise, a nonprofit organization founded by the parents of the victims of the Sandy Hook Elementary School shooting.

Conway donated $1 million to fund the Firearms Challenge of the Smart Tech Challenges Foundation, a nonprofit organization he founded with the mission to promote firearms safety through technology and innovation.

Political activities
Conway was the single largest campaign contributor to Ed Lee in his successful campaign for Mayor of San Francisco in November 2011; Conway raised $600,000 for Lee through independent expenditure committees. Since then questions have been raised about whether Lee has taken actions to benefit companies in which Conway has investments.

In 2012, Conway founded the San Francisco Citizens Initiative for Technology and Innovation, or sf.citi, a 501(c) organization that advocates for the technology community and is involved in a number of public initiatives, and private/public partnerships involving tech companies partnering with public agencies such as the San Francisco Health Department, the Office of Emergency Management, the police department, and the school district.

In April 2013, a lobbying group called FWD.us (aimed at lobbying for immigration reform and improvements to education) was launched, with Ron Conway listed as one of the supporters.

In 2014, Conway, along with fellow Airbnb investor Reid Hoffman, donated a total of $685,000 to David Chiu in support of Chiu's tightly fought Assembly campaign against current San Francisco supervisor and 2015 Prop F supporter David Campos.

Conway has been highly critical of President Donald Trump, especially on the issues of gun control and immigration. He was reported to have spent more than $1 million and raised millions more to support efforts to win Democratic control of the U.S. House of Representatives in 2018. Recode named him one of ten major Silicon Valley donors and fundraisers for the 2018 November midterm elections 

Conway was also an early supporter of Mayor London Breed, though in 2018 his focus remained on national issues over local San Francisco elections. However, his wife, Gayle, donated $200,500 to a political action committee that attacked Breed's opponent Jane Kim.

Conway serves as co-chair of the COVID-19 Technology Task Force, an technology industry coalition founded in March 2020 collaborating to respond to and recover from the COVID-19 pandemic.

In August 2022, Conway contributed $50,000 to The Next 50, a liberal political action committee (PAC).

Angelgate 
In September 2010, Ron was involved with Angelgate.

References

External links 

 SV Angel

1951 births
American businesspeople
Angel investors
Living people
People from San Francisco
San Jose State University alumni
Silicon Valley people